Bailleul-aux-Cornailles is a commune in the Pas-de-Calais department in the Hauts-de-France region of France.

Geography
A farming village located 18 miles (28 km) northeast of Arras at the junction of the N39 and D83 roads.

Population

Sights
 The church of St. Pierre, dating from the fifteenth century.
 The ancient priory of Bailleulet.

See also
Communes of the Pas-de-Calais department

References

Communes of Pas-de-Calais